Brick and Mirror (Persian title: Khesht o Ayeneh - ) is a 1964 Iranian Persian-genre drama film directed by Ebrahim Golestan and starring Zakaria Hashemi, Akbar Meshkin, Pari Saberi, Jamshid Mashayekhi, Mohammad-Ali Keshavarz and Manouchehr Farid. In July 2018, it was selected to be screened in the Venice Classics section at the 75th Venice International Film Festival.

Plot 
Hashem (Zakaria Hashemi) is a taxi driver who finds a baby child in the back seat of his cab one night after he gives a ride to a young lady. He and his girlfriend, Taji (Tajolmolouk Ahmadi), try to cope with this unwanted child. Hashem insists on getting rid of the child, Taji on keeping him.

References

External links

1964 films
1964 drama films
Iranian black-and-white films
1960s Persian-language films
Iranian drama films